Kantens is a village in the Dutch province of Groningen. It is located in the municipality of Het Hogeland, about 16 km north of the city of Groningen. It had a population of around 965 including the surrounding area in January 2017.

Kantens was a separate municipality until 1990, when it became a part of Hefshuizen.

Gallery

References

External links
 

Het Hogeland
Populated places in Groningen (province)
Former municipalities of Groningen (province)